A League of Ordinary Gentlemen is a documentary film about ten-pin bowling that was released on DVD on March 21, 2006. It was written and directed by Christopher Browne and stars PBA Tour players Pete Weber, Walter Ray Williams Jr., Chris Barnes, and Wayne Webb.

It was first televised nationally on the PBS series Independent Lens on April 25, 2006.

Synopsis
The documentary follows four professional ten-pin bowlers at various stages of their careers after the Professional Bowlers Association is purchased by a trio of Microsoft programmers, who then hire Steve Miller, a Nike marketing guru, to revitalize the sport.

Cast
Steve Miller
Wayne Webb, a 20-time champion and 1980 PBA Player of the Year who has fallen on hard times
Pete Weber, son of legendary bowler Dick Weber and renowned "bad boy" of the PBA who was serving a disciplinary suspension when the PBA Tour was purchased
Walter Ray Williams Jr., the dominant player on tour, with 36 PBA titles
Chris Barnes, a comparatively young pro trying to support his wife and newborn twins

Soundtrack
The documentary features the song by comedian Stephen Lynch called "Bowling Song (Almighty Malachi, Professional Bowling God)." This track is featured on Lynch's second official album, Superhero, released in 2002.

DVD features
 Deleted Scenes
 PBA TV Spots
 Skills Challenge Highlights
 PBA Event Clips
 Dexter Approach: Tips and Techniques (Hosted by 13-time PBA Tour titlist and current Fox Sports 1 (FS1) TV color-analyst Randy Pedersen.)
 Theatrical Trailer

Featured bowlers after the film
Wayne Webb never won another regular PBA Tour title after the completion of the film. He now runs Wayne Webb's Columbus Bowl in Columbus, Ohio, and for several years ran a karaoke business on the side. He later joined the PBA Senior Tour (for players age 50 and older, now named the PBA50 Tour), and made a splash by winning the 2008 Senior U.S. Open. In 2010, he was named PBA Senior Player of the Year.

Chris Barnes earned his first-ever PBA Player of the Year award in the 2007-08 season. He twice won what was (at the time) the biggest prize check in the history of televised bowling ($200,000) by winning the Motel 6 Roll to Riches events in 2005 and 2006. Barnes was inducted into the PBA Hall of Fame in 2018, and won his 19th PBA Tour title later that year.

In September, 2006, Walter Ray Williams Jr. surpassed Earl Anthony for first place on the PBA's All-Time titles list with his win over Pete Weber in the Dydo Japan Cup. Walter earned 47 PBA Tour titles (the most all-time), with his final title coming at the USBC Masters in February, 2010. He retired from the standard PBA Tour in 2021 at age 61, but still participates on the PBA50 Tour. In August of 2021, Williams won his 15th PBA50 Tour title, surpassing John Handegard for the most titles all-time on that tour. He is still going strong on the PBA50 Tour at age 63, winning his 16th title in the 2022 season.

As of 2022, Pete Weber is fourth on the PBA's all-time list with 37 titles, with his most recent title coming at age 50 in the PBA Tournament of Champions on March 31, 2013. At the time, that victory tied Weber with Earl Anthony for the most major championships in PBA Tour history (10). A year earlier (2012), Weber won his record fifth U.S. Open title. Like Williams, Weber retired from the regular PBA Tour in 2021, but continues to compete on the PBA50 Tour, where he has won 13 titles.

Legacy
The seventh episode of the 2015 series of Documentary Now! (IFC), "Any Given Saturday Afternoon", is a mockumentary of A League of Ordinary Gentlemen.

References

External links
 
Official Website
Official PBS website of first national showing
Rotten Tomatoes list of reviews of the documentary

Ten-pin bowling films
American sports documentary films